"Happy People" is a 1974 single by The Temptations, co-written by Lionel Richie. It was the first single from the A Song For You album. In the United States, the single went to #1 on the R&B chart and #40 on the Billboard Hot 100 singles chart. "Happy People" also peaked at #11 on the disco/dance chart. The single was the first Temptations release without the guidance of Norman Whitfield since 1966.

Personnel
 Lead vocals by Dennis Edwards
 Background vocals by Richard Street, Damon Harris, Melvin Franklin and Otis Williams
 Instrumentation by The Commodores

References

1974 singles
The Temptations songs
Songs written by Lionel Richie
Songs written by Jeffrey Bowen
1974 songs